Dorycera grandis is a species of picture-winged fly in the genus Dorycera of the family Ulidiidae. found in 
France, Italy, and Spain.

References

grandis
Insects described in 1869
Diptera of Europe
Taxa named by Camillo Rondani